Brookins Campbell (1808December 25, 1853) was an American politician and a member of the United States House of Representatives for the 1st congressional district of Tennessee.

Biography
He was born in Washington County, Tennessee in 1808. He attended the rural schools and graduated from Washington College, now known as Washington and Lee University, at Lexington. He studied law, was admitted to the bar, and practiced. He was a member of the Tennessee House of Representatives from 1835 to 1839, from 1841 to 1846, and from 1851 to 1853. He served as Speaker in 1845.

During the Mexican–American War, he was appointed by President Polk in 1846 to be an assistant quartermaster to the Army with the rank of major. He was elected as a Democrat to the Thirty-third Congress and served from March 4, 1853, until his death in Washington, D.C. on December 25, 1853, without having qualified. He was interred in Providence Presbyterian Churchyard in Greene County, Tennessee.

See also
 List of United States Congress members who died in office (1790–1899)

References

External links

Speakers of the Tennessee House of Representatives
1808 births
1853 deaths
People from Washington County, Tennessee
Washington and Lee University alumni
Democratic Party members of the United States House of Representatives from Tennessee
19th-century American politicians